Charles Williams is the eponymous debut album recorded by American saxophonist Charles Williams in 1971 for the Mainstream label.

Reception

AllMusic awarded the album 4 stars and its review by Jason Ankeny states "Williams proves a deceptively commanding presence, eschewing pyrotechnics and histrionics on a series of earthy yet accomplished solos that ripple with imagination. The organic groove extends across the record, and while each player shines, the music is far greater than the sum of its parts".

Track listing
All compositions by Charles Williams except as indicated
 "You Got Me Running" (Jimmy Reed) - 7:53  
 "Please Send Me Someone to Love" (Percy Mayfield) - 7:51  
 "Bacon Butt Fat" - 5:33  
 "Country Mile" - 3:50  
 "Catfish Sam'ich" - 5:05  
 "There Is No Greater Love" (Isham Jones, Marty Symes) - 8:39  
 "(Where Do I Begin?) Love Story" (Carl Sigman, Francis Lai) - 2:44 Bonus track on CD reissue

Personnel 
Charles Williams - alto saxophone
David "Bubba" Brooks - tenor saxophone
Earl Dunbar - guitar
Don Pullen - organ
Gordon Edwards - electric bass
Bill Curtis - drums

References 

1971 debut albums
Charles Williams (musician) albums
Mainstream Records albums
Albums produced by Bob Shad